Lion House may refer to:

 Lion House (Columbus, Georgia), a historic house (also known as the Hoxey-Cargill House) in Columbus, Georgia, United States, listed on the National Register of Historic Places
 Lion House (Kaluga), a cultural heritage monument in Kaluga, Kaluga Oblast, Russia
 Lion House (Salt Lake City), a former residence of Brigham Young in Salt Lake City, Utah, United States